The Stevenson-Carson School District is located in Skamania County, Washington, with the district office in Stevenson, Washington It consists of
 Carson Elementary School in  Carson, Washington
 Stevenson Elementary School in Stevenson, Washington. 
 Columbia George School in Carson, Washington
 Wind River Middle School in Stevenson, Washington.
 Stevenson High School in Stevenson, Washington 

, there were 842 students in the district.

References

External links
 

Public elementary schools in Washington (state)
Schools in Skamania County, Washington